Zambia National U-20 Football team are the U-20 football team for Zambia also known as the Junior Chipolpolo as the senior side are simply known as Chipolopolo(Copper Bullets). They came in fourth place in the African Youth Championship 2007, which meant they qualified for the U-20 World Cup where they were in eliminated by 5-time winners of the African Youth Championship Nigeria.

Zambia U20 soccer team has won the COSAFA U20 Cup 2022 in eSwatini

Current squad

2017 Africa U-20 Cup of Nations

Semi-finals

Final

Award

Winners

Individual awards
The following awards were given at the conclusion of the tournament.
Total Man of the Competition
 Patson Daka

Top scorer
 Luther Singh (4 goals, 2 assists)

Fair Play Award

FIFA U-20 World Cup Appearances

2017 FIFA U-20 World Cup

Round of 16

Quarter-finals

Final ranking
As per statistical convention in football, matches decided in extra time are counted as wins and losses, while matches decided by penalty shoot-outs are counted as draws.

Fixtures and Results

Class of 2007
 Rainford Kalaba
 Nyambe Mulenga
 Rogers Kola
 Aggripa Simpemba
 Jacob Banda
 Fwayo Tembo
 Joseph Zimba
 Clifford Mulenga

References

External links
 

African national under-20 association football teams
under-20